"Shall the Dust Praise Thee?" is a science fiction short story by American writer Damon Knight. It was first published in the anthology Dangerous Visions (1967). His agent refused to publish it and suggested the Atheist Journal in Moscow might buy it, but no one else would. The title comes from Psalm 30:9 in the Bible.

Summary
God arrives on Earth, ready to inflict the Day of Wrath on humankind, but finds that all life has already disappeared. The angels tell God that there has been a great war between England, Russia, China, and America which has wiped out all life on earth, and that the true end of days had already occurred through nuclear warfare. No living creatures, no water, no grass, nothing but dust and brittle stone remain on the world. All that remains of humanity is the phrase left by the last humans as a message to God, saying, "WE WERE HERE. WHERE WERE YOU?"

References

External links 

1967 short stories
Science fiction short stories
Dangerous Visions short stories
Short stories by Damon Knight